Algerian registration plates are manufactured according to the same standards as their French counterparts (prior to 2009), using the same font and dimensions – although there has been a recent tendency to apply custom typefaces (Impact and Century Gothic have been observed).

Standard plates 

Standard issue plates are white with black digits (affixed to the front of the vehicle) and yellow with black digits (mounted onto the rear of the vehicle). Being composed solely of numbers, they are one of the few vehicle registration plates which can accurately be referred to as 'number plates'.

Example of front and rear plates on a private vehicle manufactured in 1963, and registered in Blida

Example of front and rear plates on a private vehicle manufactured in 2020, and registered in Bordj Bou Arréridj Wilaya

The registration mark takes the form of three groups of digits separated by a space (early plates were separated with a hyphen). Since the late-1990s, 
The first group of numbers is composed of 5 digits (including leading zeroes – earlier plates have up to three digits with no leading zeroes), which make up the vehicle's actual registration/serial number.

Vehicle Class
The first digit in the 3-digit group indicates the class of the vehicle in accordance with the following list:
 Private Vehicles
 Trucks
 Vans (Camionettes)
 Buses
 Tractor units
 Other Tractors
 Special vehicles
 Trailers
 Motorcycles
The last two digits in the 3-digit group indicate the year in which the vehicle was manufactured. For example: 115 would indicate a private vehicle manufactured in 2015; 498 would indicate a bus manufactured in 1998; 903 would indicate a motorcycle manufactured in 2003; &c.  Where the year of manufacture was unknown, the arbitrary number 22 was assigned (e.g. 122 for a private vehicle). As of December 2022, this number has been replaced with 33 to avoid conflict with regular registrations for vehicles manufactured in 2022.

Wilayas
A two-digit suffix on the plate identifies the wilaya (Arabic: ولاية) or province in which the vehicle was first registered. Beginning in January 2022, the 10 new wilayas created on December 18, 2019, will receive registrations plates with their own specific codes. These have been marked in italics in the table below.

In November 2022, the Algerian government has approved a draft executive decree on the introduction of a single national vehicle registration number, which is currently in the "final stages of the process".

Specifications
Front plates must be white in colour, whilst rear plates must be yellow, and the digits must always be black. All other colours are unacceptable and can result in a fine. Regular registration plates consist of a single line of digits. The length of these plates is specified as being between 455 and 520 mm, with a height between 100 and 110 mm. The height of the digits must be 75 mm. The digit 1 is to have a width of 20 mm, and all other digits a width of 30 mm. Numbers are to be uniformly separated by a space of 10 mm. 

Registration plates featuring two lines of digits are also permissible. These plates have a width of 275 mm, and a height of 200 mm. The rest of the specifications are the same as for single-line plates.

Motorcycle plates have a width of 140 mm, and a height of 120 mm, with the digits printed on two lines. The dimensions of the digits are smaller than those found on regular plates: 45 mm in height, and 26 mm in width – the digit 1 which must be 15 mm wide.

Special plates 

Diplomatic vehicles are issued with plates featuring three groups of black digits, separated by hyphens, on a light teal background. The first group are the vehicle's actual registration/serial number (up to 3 digits in length); the second is composed of two digits indicating whether the vehicle belongs to a diplomat or embassy staff. The final two digits identify the embassy itself (e.g. 27 for Italy; 37 for Norway, &c.)

Example of front and rear plates on a diplomatic vehicle belonging to the Italian embassy

References

External links

Road transport in Algeria
Algeria
 Registration plates
Algeria transport-related lists